The 2018 THB Champions League is the top level football competition in Madagascar. The season began on 22 June 2018.

First phase
Played between 22 June and 1 July. Final standings:

Vondrona A

Vondrona B

Vondrona C

Vondrona D

Second phase
Played between 13 and 22 July. Final standings:

Vondrona 1

Vondrona 2

Final phase
Also known as Poule des As. Played between 5 August and 23 September (home-and-away basis). Qualified teams:
CNaPS Sport
Fosa Juniors
Vakinankaratra
Elgeco Plus

Final table.

 1.CNaPS Sports (Itasy)                   6   4  1  1   9- 3  13  Champions
 2.Fosa Juniors FC (Boeny)                6   3  1  2   9- 6  10
 3.AS St.-Michel Elgeco Plus (Analamanga) 6   2  1  3   9-12   7
 4.FC Vakinankaratra (Vakinankaratra)     6   1  1  4   7-13   4

See also
2018 Coupe de Madagascar

References

Football leagues in Madagascar
Premier League
Madagascar